The Essential is a greatest hits album released by Gang Gajang in 1996. It features all the tracks from their 1985 self-titled debut and several songs from their other albums.

Track listing
All songs written by Mark Callaghan unless otherwise indicated.
 "Sounds of Then (This is Australia)"  – 3:56
 "Gimme Some Lovin" (Callaghan, Graham Bidstrup)  – 2:47
 "Hundreds Of Languages" (Callaghan, Robert James)  – 3:36
 "Ordinary World" (Bidstrup, Callaghan, James)  – 3:54
 "Giver of Life" (Geoffrey Stapleton, Chris Bailey, Callaghan, Bidstrup, Kayellen Bidstrup aka Kay Bee)  – 3:40
 "Distraction"  – 3:20
 "Talk to Me"  – 4:02
 "Initiation" (Callaghan, Bidstrup)  – 3:28
 "Maybe I" (Bidstrup, Callaghan)  – 3:35
 "American Money" (Stapleton)  – 3:43
 "Ambulance Men"  – 3:24
 "Tree of Love"  – 4:18
 "House of Cards"  – 2:48
 "To the North" (Bidstrup, Callaghan)  – 2:47
 "Initiation (Mad Wax Mix)" (Callaghan, Bidstrup)  – 3:29
 "Sounds of Then (Mad Wax Mix)"  – 3:24
 "The Bigger They Are"  – 3:29
 "Luck of the Irish" – 3:46
 "Shadow of Your Love" (Bidstrup, Callaghan)  – 3:07

Charts

Weekly charts

References

1996 greatest hits albums
Gang Gajang albums
Compilation albums by Australian artists